Be with Me is a 2005 Singaporean drama film directed by Eric Khoo. The film is inspired by the life of deaf-and-blind teacher Theresa Poh Lin Chan. It premiered as the Director's Fortnight selection in the 2005 Cannes Film Festival. It was also the official entry from Singapore for the 78th Academy Awards in the foreign language category. In December 2005, the academy body disqualified the film on grounds that the dialogue is mainly in English. Out of 93 minutes, the film only has two and a half minutes of dialogue.

Be with Me is the first film in Singapore to explicitly feature a lesbian relationship.

Cast
 Ng Sway Ah as Father
 Sanwan Bin Rais as Security Supervisor
 Theresa Poh Lin Chan as herself
 John Cheong Puk Fai as Sam's father
 Elizabeth Choy as herself
 Leong Kooi Eng as Mother
 Lim Poey Huang as Jackie's mother
 Seet Keng Yew as Fatty Koh
 Shaun Koh as Sam's brother
 Ezann Lee as Jackie
 Poh Huat Lim as Brother
 Sherry Lim as Sam's mother
 Toh Cheng Onn as Neighbour
 Lynn Poh as Ann
 Chiew Sung Ching as Shopkeeper
 Jason Tan as Brian
 Royston Tan
 Samantha Tan as Sam
 Maximilan Wong as Neighbour's son
 Lawrence Yong as Son
 Seet Keng Yew as Security Guard

Release 
Be with Me premiered at the Director’s Fortnight selection of the 2005 Festival de Cannes.

Reception
Ong Sor Fern of The Straits Times rated the film 4 stars out of 5 and wrote, "The way Khoo has marshalled his technical skills in the service of more characterisation and story marks a new stage in his development."

Geoffrey Eu of The Business Times gave the film a rating of "B-" and wrote that "Chan's story overwhelms everything else around it and the result is a film that is elegant but uneven in tempo - the soft-edged style is there in abundance, but the movie's progress is perhaps not as smooth as it could be."

References

External links
 
 
 

2005 films
2000s Cantonese-language films
2000s English-language films
Hokkien-language films
Singaporean independent films
Singaporean LGBT-related films
Lesbian-related films
2000s Mandarin-language films
2005 romantic drama films
Tactile signing-language films
Films directed by Eric Khoo
Films about blind people
Films about disability